Roland George Lee (born 30 July 1964) is an English former competitive swimmer. Who attended Tewkesbury School

Swimming career
Lee competed in the European championships and three consecutive Olympics for Great Britain, and swam for England in the Commonwealth Games. Lee specialised in the 100 metres freestyle.

He represented England and won a silver medal in the 4 x 100 metres medley relay and a bronze medal in the 4 x 100 metres freestyle relay, at the 1986 Commonwealth Games in Edinburgh, Scotland. He was also a two times winner of the ASA National Championship in the 100 metres freestyle in (1986 and 1987) and the 1988 200 metres freestyle champion.

See also
 List of Commonwealth Games medallists in swimming (men)

References

1964 births
Living people
Commonwealth Games bronze medallists for England
Commonwealth Games silver medallists for England
English male freestyle swimmers
European Aquatics Championships medalists in swimming
Olympic swimmers of Great Britain
People from Bicester
Swimmers at the 1984 Summer Olympics
Swimmers at the 1988 Summer Olympics
Swimmers at the 1992 Summer Olympics
Commonwealth Games medallists in swimming
Swimmers at the 1986 Commonwealth Games
Medallists at the 1986 Commonwealth Games